Michigan Bluff (formerly, Michigan Bluffs and Michigan City) is an unincorporated community in Placer County, California.

The original settlement was called Michigan City, but after erosion threatened the town it was moved up-slope and renamed Michigan Bluff. The Michigan City post office operated from 1854 to 1943.

The town was founded by gold miners. Mining began in earnest in 1853, and town was shipping $100,000 in gold per month by 1858. Leland Stanford ran a store in the town from 1853 to 1855. After hydraulic mining was banned, the town entered decline. The town is now registered as California Historical Landmark #402.

References

External links
 Michigan Bluff, Placer County, California, from Directory of the County of Placer County, California 1861, on the website of californiagenealogy.org

Unincorporated communities in Placer County, California
Mining communities of the California Gold Rush
Populated places in the Sierra Nevada (United States)
California Historical Landmarks
Unincorporated communities in California